Turn It Up is a studio album released on 6 May 2016, by the Washington, D.C.-based go-go band Rare Essence. The album is the band's first studio album since the release of RE-2000.

Track listing

"VIP" – 3:28
"Turn It Up" (featuring DJ Kool) – 3:41
"Tryna Go" (featuring Raheem DeVaughn and Dee Boy) – 3:39
"Hold Me Down" (featuring Ms Kim) – 3:53
"How Sexy Can You Get" (featuring Jas Funk) – 4:38
"It's On Tonight" – 4:03
"How I Wish You Could Love Me" (featuring Kacey Williams) – 3:31
"You're The Only One" (featuring Art Sherrod) – 3:38
"Think You Betta" – 4:12
"Fly Shyt (Cal's Freestyle)" – 3:01
"She Can't Help It" (featuring Art Sherrod and Michael Muse) – 4:18

References

External links
 Turn It Up at AllMusic

2016 albums
Rare Essence albums